The Abierto Internacional Varonil Casablanca Cancún is a professional tennis tournament played on outdoor red clay courts. It is currently part of the Association of Tennis Professionals (ATP) Challenger Tour. It is held annually in Cancún, Mexico, since 2008.

Past finals

Singles

Doubles

External links
ITF search

ATP Challenger Tour
Clay court tennis tournaments
Recurring sporting events established in 2008
Tennis tournaments in Mexico
Sport in Cancún